Yann Michael Yao (born 20 June 1997) is an Ivorian footballer who plays for MFK Skalica as a winger.

Club career
He made his Austrian Football Second League debut for Floridsdorfer on 18 August 2017 in a game against Kapfenberger SV.

References

External links
 

1997 births
Living people
Ivorian footballers
Ivorian expatriate footballers
AS Denguélé players
Ligue 1 (Ivory Coast) players
Floridsdorfer AC players
2. Liga (Austria) players
Meistriliiga players
Paide Linnameeskond players
FC Spartak Trnava players
ŠKF Sereď players
MFK Skalica players
Slovak Super Liga players
Association football midfielders
Expatriate footballers in Austria
Expatriate footballers in Estonia
Expatriate footballers in Slovakia
Ivorian expatriate sportspeople in Austria
Ivorian expatriate sportspeople in Estonia
Ivorian expatriate sportspeople in Slovakia
People from Dabou